Zenon Kliszko (Łódź, December 8, 1908 – September 4, 1989, Warsaw), was a politician in the Polish People's Republic, considered the  man of Polish United Workers' Party (PZPR) leader Władysław Gomułka.

Kliszko graduated from Warsaw University and joined the Polish Communist Party in 1931. He was arrested in 1934 for anti-state agitation and released after the courts established that he was mentally challenged. Kliszko took part in the Warsaw Uprising during Nazi German occupation of Poland and escaped capture by swimming across the river. He met Gomułka in Lublin, befriended him, and became the KC PZPR functionary after the Soviet takeover in 1945.

Crimes
Kliszko was responsible for issuing an order to regular army units under General Bolesław Chocha to open fire on striking workers in Gdańsk and Gdynia during the Polish 1970 protests. On Kliszko´s advice and recommendation, the communist party took down the production of Dziady by Mickiewicz at the Polish Theatre in Warsaw, leading to 1968 Polish political crisis and the student protests across the country, brutally suppressed by ORMO, as well as the expulsion from Poland of thousands of individuals of Jewish ancestry. He was fired from his job and removed from the Party by Edward Gierek.

References

1908 births
1989 deaths
Politicians from Łódź
People from Piotrków Governorate
Communist Party of Poland politicians
Polish Workers' Party politicians
Members of the Politburo of the Polish United Workers' Party
Members of the State National Council
Members of the Polish Sejm 1947–1952
Members of the Polish Sejm 1957–1961
Members of the Polish Sejm 1961–1965
Members of the Polish Sejm 1965–1969
Members of the Polish Sejm 1969–1972
Gwardia Ludowa members
Armia Ludowa members
Recipients of the Silver Cross of the Virtuti Militari
Recipients of the Order of the Builders of People's Poland
Recipients of the Order of the Cross of Grunwald, 2nd class
Recipients of the Order of the Banner of Work
Burials at Powązki Military Cemetery